Taiyi Zhenren is a deity in Chinese religion and Taoism. Taiyi means "primordial unity of yin and yang" and Zhenren is a Daoist term for "Perfected Person". According to the opening of the classical novel Fengshen Bang, he is the reincarnation of the first emperor of the Shang dynasty, Tang of Shang.

Taiyi Tianzun 

Taiyi Zhenren is the name given to him in Investiture of the Gods and he is based on the deity Taiyi Jiuku Tianzun. In  orthodox Taoism, he is the deity of salvation for all sentient beings in the 10 directions with a different incarnation for each direction and can transform into other incarnations for any purpose. He is invoked during funerals and rituals for the dead to send them to the Eastern Heavenly Pureland Chang Le where he resides and is also invoked to save suffering souls from hell during the Ghost Festival.

In fiction
In Fengshen Bang, Taiyi Zhenren is the renowned teacher of Nezha, the celestial being destined to bring peace back to the Zhou Dynasty. Taiyi Zhenren is stationed atop Mount Champion and instructed Nezha to stay at Old Pond Pass - the place he had been born. After Nezha experienced great trouble with Ao Guang and went fleeing back to him, Taiyi Zhenren would at first be seen in deep thought; Zhenren would soon draw an "invisible juju" along his back however—as to give him a safe passage to heaven through invisibility.

After Nezha created further issues with stone spirit Shiji Niangniang, Taiyi Zhenren would soon be seen face to face with her in front of Taiyi Zhenren's cave which Nezha retreated into for protection. After having no choice but to be rid of Shiji Niangniang, he would start off by disabling the silk scarf which she stole from Nezha, and then trap her within his Nine-dragon-fire-net. While trapped in this net, Taiyi Zhenren summoned several dragons which unleashed a large volley of fire into the net; instantly killing Shiji and turning her back into her original form as a molten rock.

References

Sources
 Fengshen Yanyi chapter 12

Chinese gods
Investiture of the Gods characters
Deities in Taoism